Kenton / Wagner is an album by the Stan Kenton Orchestra performing jazz arrangements of Richard Wagner's compositions recorded in 1964 and released by Capitol Records.

Reception

The Allmusic review by Scott Yanow noted "Somehow Kenton turns Wagner's music into jazz, capturing the intense emotion, pomposity and drama with daring ideas. Not for all tastes, this LP was one of Stan Kenton's last innovative recordings".

Track listing
All compositions by Richard Wagner.
 "Ride of the Valkyries from "Die Walküre"" - 3:17 
 "Siegfried's Funeral March from "Götterdämmerung"" - 7:44  
 "Prelude to Act I of "Lohengrin"" - 6:11  
 "Prelude to Act III of "Lohengrin" - 3:12  
 "Prelude to "Tristan Und Isolde"" - 6:55  
 "Love-Death from "Tristan Und Isolde"" - 6:18  
 "Wedding March from "Lohengrin"" - 2:36  
 "Pilgrims' Chorus from "Tannhaeuser"" - 3:54

Recorded at Capitol Studios in Hollywood, CA on September 16, 1964 (track 6), September 17, 1964 (tracks 1 & 2), September 18, 1964 (tracks 3 & 5) and September 24, 1964 (tracks 4, 7 & 8).

Personnel
Stan Kenton - piano, arranger, conductor
Bud Brisbois, Bobby Bryant, Conte Candoli, Ronnie Ossa, Dalton Smith - trumpet
Bob Fitzpatrick, John Halliburton (tracks 1-5, 7 & 8), Kent Larsen, Tommy Shepard (track 6)  - trombone
Jim Amlotte - bass trombone
John Cave, Vincent DeRosa, Bill Hinshaw, Arthur Maebe, Dick Perissi - French horn
Clive Acker - tuba
Gabe Baltazar (track 6), Lennie Niehaus (tracks 1-5, 7 & 8) - alto saxophone
Buddy Collette (tracks 1, 2 & 6), Bob Hardaway (tracks 3-5, 7 & 8), Bill Perkins - tenor saxophone
Jack Nimitz - baritone saxophone
Chuck Gentry - bass saxophone
Don Bagley (tracks 3-8), Joe Comfort (tracks 1 & 2) - bass 
Irving Cottler - drums 
Frank Carlson - timpani, bongos

References

Stan Kenton albums
1964 albums
Capitol Records albums
Albums conducted by Stan Kenton
Albums recorded at Capitol Studios
Richard Wagner
Albums produced by Lee Gillette